John William Mellor (born 1896, date of death unknown) was an English footballer who played for New Mills and Port Vale in the 1920s.

Career
Mellor played for New Mills, before joining Port Vale in an amateur capacity in April 1920. He made nine Second Division appearances in the 1920–21 season before returning to old club New Mills, most probably sometime in 1922. However, he rejoined the Vale in July 1923, this time signing as a professional. Again though he failed to make much of an impression at The Old Recreation Ground, and was released at the end of the season after just six games, once again he returned to New Mills.

Career statistics
Source:

References

People from Buxton
Footballers from Derbyshire
English footballers
Association football midfielders
New Mills A.F.C. players
Port Vale F.C. players
English Football League players
1896 births
Year of death missing